The following is a list of football stadiums in Russia rated by capacity. The minimum capacity is 5,000.

Current stadiums

See also 

Football in Russia
List of indoor arenas in Russia 
List of European stadiums by capacity

References

 
Russia
Stadiums
Football stadiums